Glaze is a surname. Notable people with the surname include:

Andrew Glaze (1920–2016), American poet
Ralph Glaze (1882–1968), American athlete and coach
Peter Glaze (1917–1983), English comedian
Terry Glaze (born 1964), American singer

See also
Glazer, surname
Glaser, surname